Brylan Van Artsdalen (born August 14, 1984) is an American mixed martial artist currently competing in the Featherweight division. A professional competitor since 2010, Van Artsdalen has formerly competed for Bellator and CES MMA.

Mixed martial arts career

Bellator MMA
Van Artsdalen made his professional and Bellator debut against Rich de los Reyes on April 22, 2010 at Bellator 15. Van Artsdalen lost the fight via rear-naked choke submission in the second round.

Van Artsdalen would then go on to win his next five bouts in smaller promotions before returning to Bellator and facing Joel Roberts at Bellator 49 on September 10, 2011. Van Artsdalen lost the fight via triangle choke submission in the second round.

Van Artsdalen quickly returned and faced Scott Heckman at Bellator 59 on November 26, 2011. He lost the fight via first-round guillotine choke submission.

Van Artsdalen was defeated by Neil Johnson via rear-naked choke at Bellator 71 before claiming his first win for the promotion via guillotine choke submission versus Jay Haas at Bellator 74 on September 28, 2012.

Van Artsdalen faced Terrell Hobbs at Bellator 83 on December 7, 2012. He lost the fight via rear-naked choke submission in the first round.

On April 4, 2013, Van Artsdalen faced Kevin Roddy at Bellator 95. Van Artsdalen lost the fight via armbar submission in the second round.

Van Artsdalen replaced Andrew Calandrelli to face fellow Bellator veteran Ryan Quinn at Bellator 98 on September 7, 2013. Van Artsdalen was defeated by Quinn via arm-triangle choke submission in the first round.

Mixed martial arts record

|-
|Loss
|align=center|9-12
|Matthew DiMarcantonio
|Submission (kimura)
|GPG 21: Fighting for Autism
|
|align=center|1
|align=center|3:03
|Pennsauken Township, New Jersey, United States
|
|-
|Win
|align=center|9–11
|Steve McCabe
|Submission (neck crank)
|Matrix Fights 9
|
|align=center|1
|align=center|1:34
|Philadelphia, Pennsylvania, United States
|
|-
|Loss
|align=center|8–11
|Justin Steave
|Submission (guillotine choke)
|Pinnacle FC: Pittsburgh Challenge Series 7
|
|align=center|1
|align=center|0:57
|Pittsburgh, Pennsylvania, United States
|
|-
|Loss
|align=center|8–10
|Charles Rosa
|Submission (armbar)
|CES MMA 22
|
|align=center|1
|align=center|3:25
|Lincoln, Rhode Island, United States
|Return to Featherweight.
|-
|Loss
|align=center|8–9
|Joshua Killion
|Submission (rear-naked choke)
|Matrix Fights 8
|
|align=center|2
|align=center|3:11
|Philadelphia, Pennsylvania, United States
|
|-
|Loss
|align=center|8–8
|Ryan Quinn
|Submission (arm-triangle choke)
|Bellator 98
|
|align=center|1
|align=center|2:34
|Uncasville, Connecticut, United States 
|
|-
|Loss
|align=center|8–7
|Lester Caslow
|Submission (rear-naked choke)
|CFFC 26: Sullivan vs. Martinez
|
|align=center|1
|align=center|3:55
|Atlantic City, New Jersey, United States
|
|-
|Win
|align=center|8–6
|Justin Dalton
|TKO (shoulder injury)
|XFE: Cage Wars 23
|
|align=center|1
|align=center|0:43
|Chester, Pennsylvania, United States
|
|-
|Loss
|align=center|7–6
|Kevin Roddy
|Submission (armbar)
|Bellator 95
|
|align=center|2
|align=center|1:04
|Atlantic City, New Jersey, United States
|
|-
|Loss
|align=center|7–5
|Terrell Hobbs
|Submission (rear-naked choke)
|Bellator 83
|
|align=center|1
|align=center|3:07
|Atlantic City, New Jersey, United States
|
|-
|Win
|align=center|7–4
|Jay Haas
|Submission (guillotine choke)
|Bellator 74
|
|align=center|1
|align=center|1:03
|Atlantic City, New Jersey, United States
|
|-
|Loss
|align=center|6–4
|Neil Johnson
|Submission (rear-naked choke)
|Bellator 71
|
|align=center|2
|align=center|4:29
|Chester, West Virginia, United States
|
|-
|Win
|align=center|6–3
|Billy Vaughan
|Submission (D'arce choke)
|Matrix Fights 5
|
|align=center|1
|align=center|2:00
|Philadelphia, Pennsylvania, United States
|
|-
|Loss
|align=center|5–3
|Scott Heckman
|Submission (guillotine choke)
|Bellator 59
|
|align=center|1
|align=center|1:38
|Atlantic City, New Jersey, United States
|
|-
|Loss
|align=center|5–2
|Joel Roberts
|Technical Submission (triangle choke)
|Bellator 49
|
|align=center|2
|align=center|1:47
|Atlantic City, New Jersey, United States
|
|-
|Win
|align=center|5–1
|Anthony Leone
|Technical Submission (guillotine choke)
|XFE - Cage Wars 8: House of Pain
|
|align=center|1
|align=center|1:45
|Atlantic City, New Jersey, United States
|
|-
|Win
|align=center|4–1
|Brett Ewing
|Submission (anaconda choke)
|Matrix Fights 4
|
|align=center|1
|align=center|2:21
|Philadelphia, Pennsylvania, United States
|
|-
|Win
|align=center|3–1
|Patrick White
|Submission (arm-triangle choke)
|Xtreme Fight Events: Cage Wars 5
|
|align=center|1
|align=center|4:15
|Chester, Pennsylvania, United States
|
|-
|Win
|align=center|2–1
|Julio Rosario
|Submission (rear-naked choke)
|Matrix Fights 3
|
|align=center|2
|align=center|2:22
|Philadelphia, Pennsylvania, United States
|
|-
|Win
|align=center|1–1
|Shane Hutchinson
|Submission (anaconda choke)
|Matrix Fights 2
|
|align=center|1
|align=center|0:15
|Philadelphia, Pennsylvania, United States
|
|-
|Loss
|align=center|0–1
|Rich de los Reyes
|Submission (rear-naked choke)
|Bellator 15
|
|align=center|2
|align=center|2:03
|Uncasville, Connecticut, United States 
|

References

Living people
1984 births
American male mixed martial artists
Featherweight mixed martial artists
Mixed martial artists from New Jersey
People from Palmyra, New Jersey